Rashawn Frisco McCarthy (born September 10, 1989) is a Filipino-American professional basketball player for the Blackwater Bossing of the Philippine Basketball Association (PBA).

Professional career
McCarthy played two seasons with the Westports Malaysia Dragons in the ASEAN Basketball League (ABL).

McCarthy was drafted sixth overall by the San Miguel Beermen in the 2016 PBA draft.

On October 17, 2017, McCarthy, along with Ronald Tubid, Jay-R Reyes, and a 2019 first round pick, to the Kia Picanto for the first overall pick of the 2017 PBA draft. The pick was used by San Miguel to draft Christian Standhardinger.

On September 28, 2021, he was traded to the Blackwater Bossing for Simon Enciso.

PBA career statistics

As of the end of 2022–23 season

Season-by-season averages

|-
| align=left | 
| align=left | San Miguel
| 14 || 4.4 || .348 || .300 || .700 || .8 || .4 || .2 || .0 || 2.0
|-
| align=left | 
| align=left | Kia / Columbian
| 33 || 33.7 || .395 || .381 || .691 || 5.0 || 4.6 || 1.3 || .1 || 14.5
|-
| align=left | 
| align=left | Columbian
| 33 || 35.6 || .374 || .308 || .728 || 5.0 || 4.7 || 1.2 || .2 || 14.7
|-
| align=left | 
| align=left | Terrafirma
| 7 || 19.5 || .419 || .346 || .500 || 2.3 || 3.0 || .3 || .0 || 7.0
|-
| align=left rowspan=2| 
| align=left | Terrafirma
| rowspan=2|21 || rowspan=2|26.1 || rowspan=2|.354 || rowspan=2|.283 || rowspan=2|.909 || rowspan=2|2.7 || rowspan=2|2.3 || rowspan=2|.8 || rowspan=2|.2 || rowspan=2|10.6
|-
| align=left | Blackwater
|-
| align=left | 
| align=left | Blackwater
| 30 || 25.1 || .326 || .271 || .795 || 3.1 || 3.6 || .7 || .0 || 7.2
|-class=sortbottom
| align="center" colspan=2 | Career
| 138 || 27.4 || .370 || .317 || .736 || 3.7 || 3.5 || .9 || .1 || 10.7

References

1989 births
Living people
21st-century African-American sportspeople
African-American basketball players
American expatriate basketball people in Malaysia
American men's basketball players
American sportspeople of Filipino descent
Basketball players from New York (state)
Blackwater Bossing players
College men's basketball players in the United States
Filipino expatriate basketball people in Malaysia
Filipino men's basketball players
Citizens of the Philippines through descent
Kuala Lumpur Dragons players
People from Old Westbury, New York
Point guards
San Miguel Beermen draft picks
San Miguel Beermen players
Shooting guards
State University of New York at Old Westbury alumni
Terrafirma Dyip players